Bokoto (Bhogoto, Ɓòkòtò) is a Gbaya language of the Central African Republic.

References

Gbaya languages
Languages of the Central African Republic